William Wightman may refer to:

William Wightman (English MP 1361-1391), MP for Huntingdon
William Wightman (died 1580), MP
William Wightman (judge) (1784–1863), British judge
William Wightman (Canadian politician) (1929–2017)
William May Wightman (1808–1882), American educator and clergyman

See also
William Wightman Wood
William Weightman
William Weightman III